HD 102117 or Uklun  is a star in the southern constellation of Centaurus. With an apparent visual magnitude of 7.47, it is too dim to be seen without binoculars or a small telescope. It is located at a distance of approximately 129 light years from the Sun based on parallax. HD 102117 is drifting further away with a radial velocity of +50 km/s, having come to within  some 692,000 years ago. It has one known planet.

The stellar classification of HD 102117 is G6V, which matches the spectrum of an ordinary G-type main-sequence star. It is roughly five billion years old and is spinning with a projected rotational velocity of 0.9 km/s. The star shows only a low level of chromospheric activity and is photometrically stable, meaning it doesn't vary significantly in brightness. It appears metal-enriched, showing a higher abundance of heavy elements compared to the Sun.

Planetary system
In 2004, the Anglo-Australian Planet Search announced a planet orbiting the star. A short time later the HARPS team also announced the presence of a planet around this star. Both groups detected this planet with the radial velocity method.

HD 102117, and its planet HD 102117b, were chosen as part of the 2019 NameExoWorlds campaign organised by the International Astronomical Union, which assigned each country a star and planet to be named. HD 102117 was assigned to Pitcairn Islands. The winning proposal named the star Uklun, from the word aklan 'we/us' in the Pitcairn language, and the planet Leklsullun , from the phrase lekl salan 'child/children' (lit. 'little person').

See also 
 List of extrasolar planets
 HARPS spectrograph
 Anglo-Australian Planet Search

References

External links 
 

G-type main-sequence stars
Planetary systems with one confirmed planet

Centaurus (constellation)
CD-58 04207
102117
057291